The 2002–03 Scottish Cup was the 118th staging of Scotland's most prestigious football knockout competition, also known for sponsorship reasons as the Tennent's Scottish Cup. The Cup was won by Rangers who defeated Dundee in the final.

First round

Replays

Second round

Replays

Third round

Replays

Fourth round

Replays

Quarter-finals

Replays

Semi-finals

Final

Scottish Cup seasons
Scottish Cup, 2002-03
Scot